The Roman Catholic Diocese of Xingu-Altamira is a Roman Catholic diocese located in the area of the Xingu River in the ecclesiastical province of Santarém in Brazil. The cathedral is located in Altamira, Brazil.

History
On 16 August 1934, the Territorial Prelature of Xingu was established from the Metropolitan Archdiocese of Belém do Pará, Territorial Prelature of Santíssima Conceição do Araguaia and Territorial Prelature of Santarém.

At the time the Diocese of Santarém was promoted to an Archdiocese, the Territorial Prelature of Xingu was suppressed and succeeded by the Roman Catholic Diocese of Xingu-Altamira on 6 November 2019.

Episcopal ordinaries
Territorial prelates (of Xingu)
 Clemente Geiger, C.PP.S (17 January 1948 – 26 April 1971)
 Eurico Kräutler, C.PP.S (26 April 1971 – 2 September 1981)
 Erwin Kräutler, C.PP.S (2 September 1981 – 23 December 2015)
 Prelate Coadjutor (1980–1981)
 Joao Muniz Alves, OFM (23 December 2015 – 6 November 2019); see below
Bishops
 Joao Muniz Alves, OFM (6 November 2019 – present); see above

References

External links
 GCatholic.org
 Catholic Hierarchy

Roman Catholic dioceses in Brazil
Christian organizations established in 2019
Roman Catholic dioceses and prelatures established in the 21st century